Seleucia karsholti is a species of snout moth. It is found in Spain.

References

Moths described in 1995
Anerastiini